Gunfighters, also called gunslingers, or in the 19th and early 20th centuries gunmen, were individuals in the American Old West who gained a reputation of being dangerous with a gun and participated in gunfights and shootouts. Today, the term "gunslinger" is more or less used to denote someone who is quick on the draw with a pistol, but can also refer to riflemen and shotgun messengers. The gunfighter is also one of the most popular characters in the Western genre and has appeared in associated films, video games, and literature.

The gunfighter could be a lawman, outlaw, cowboy, or shooting exhibitionist, but was more commonly a hired gun who made a living with his weapons in the Old West.

Origin of the term 
The term "gunslinger" was used in the Western film Drag Harlan (1920). The word was soon adopted by other Western writers, such as Zane Grey, and became common usage. In his introduction to The Shootist (1976), author Glendon Swarthout says "gunslinger" and "gunfighter" are modern terms, and the more authentic terms for the period would have been "gunman", "pistoleer", "shootist", or "bad man" (sometimes written as "badman"). Swarthout seems to have been correct about "gunslinger", but the term "gunfighter" existed in several newspapers in the 1870s, and as such the term existed in the 19th century. Bat Masterson used the term "gunfighter" in the newspaper articles which he wrote about the lawmen and outlaws whom he had known. However, Joseph Rosa noted that, even though Masterson used the term "gunfighter", he "preferred the term 'mankiller when discussing these individuals. Clay Allison (1841–1887), a notorious New Mexico and Texas gunman and cattleman, originated the term "shootist".

Usage 
Often, the term has been applied to men who would hire out for contract killings or at a ranch embroiled in a range war where they would earn "fighting wages". Others, like Billy the Kid, were notorious bandits, and still others were lawmen like Pat Garrett and Wyatt Earp. A gunfighter could be an outlaw—a robber or murderer who took advantage of the wilderness of the frontier to hide from genteel society and to make periodic raids on it. The gunfighter could also be an agent of the state, archetypically a lone avenger, but more often a sheriff, whose duty was to face the outlaw and bring him to justice or to personally administer it. There were also a few historical cowboys who were actual gunfighters, such as the Cochise County Cowboys who participated in the bloody 1879 Skeleton Canyon massacre.

Depiction in culture 

Gunslingers frequently appear as stock characters in Western movies and novels, along with cowboys. Often, the hero of a Western meets his opposite "double", a mirror of his own evil side that he has to destroy.

Western gunslinger heroes are portrayed as local lawmen or enforcement officers, ranchers, army officers, cowboys, territorial marshals, nomadic loners, or skilled fast-draw artists. They are normally masculine persons of integrity and principle – courageous, moral, tough, solid, and self-sufficient, maverick characters (often with trusty sidekicks), possessing an independent and honorable attitude (but often characterized as slow-talking). They are depicted as similar to a knight-errant, wandering from place to place with no particular direction, often facing curious and hostile enemies, while saving individuals or communities from those enemies in terms of chivalry. The Western hero usually stands alone and faces danger on his own, commonly against lawlessness, with an expert display of his physical skills (roping, gun-play, horse-handling, pioneering abilities, etc.).

In films, the gunslinger often possesses a nearly superhuman speed and skill with the revolver. Twirling pistols, lightning draws, and trick shots are standard fare for the gunmen of the big screen. In the real world, however, gunmen who relied on flashy tricks and theatrics died quickly, and most gunslingers took a much more practical approach to their weapons. Real gunslingers did not shoot to disarm or to impress, but to kill.

Another classic bit of cinema that is largely a myth is the showdown at high noon, where two well-matched gunslingers agree to meet for a climactic formal duel. These duels did occasionally happen, as in the case of the Luke Short–Jim Courtright duel, but gunfights were typically more spontaneous, a fight that turned deadly when one side reached for a weapon, and no one knew who actually won the fight for several minutes until the air finally cleared of smoke. Gunfights could be won by simple distraction or pistols could be emptied as gunmen fought from behind cover without injury. When a gunman did square off, it rarely was with another gunfighter. Gunslingers usually gave each other a wide berth, and it was uncommon for two well-known gunslingers to face off. The gunslinger's reputation often was as valuable as any skills possessed. In Western films and books, young toughs often challenge experienced gunmen with the hopes of building a reputation, but this rarely happened in real life. A strong reputation was enough to keep others civil and often would spare a gunfighter from conflict. Even other gunslingers were likely to avoid any unnecessary confrontation.

In the days of the Old West, tales tended to grow with repeated telling, and a single fight might grow into a career-making reputation. For instance, the gunfight at the O.K. Corral made legends of Wyatt Earp and the Cochise County Cowboys, but they were relatively minor figures before that conflict. Some gunslingers, such as Bat Masterson, actively engaged in self-promotion. Johnny Ringo built a reputation as a gunslinger while never taking part in a gunfight or killing unarmed civilians.

Fact and fiction 

Most gunfights are portrayed in films or books as having two men square off, waiting for one to make the first move. This was rarely the case. Often, a gunfight was spur-of-the-moment, with one drawing his pistol, and the other reacting. Often it would develop into a shootout where both men bolted for cover. In popular folklore, men who held noteworthy reputations as a gunfighter were eager to match up against another gunman with the same reputation. On the contrary, in cases where two men held a similar reputation, both would avoid confrontation with one another whenever possible. They rarely took undue risks and usually weighed their options before confronting another well-known gunman. This respect for one another is why most famous gunfights were rarely two or more well-known gunmen matched up against one another, but rather one notable gunman against a lesser-known opponent or opponents.

These fights were usually close-up and personal, with a number of shots blasted from pistols, often resulting in innocent bystanders hit by bullets gone wild. Much of the time, it would be difficult to tell who had "won" the gunfight for several minutes, as the black powder smoke from the pistols cleared the air. How famous gunfighters died is as varied as each man. Many well-known gunfighters were so feared by the public because of their reputation that when they were killed, they died as a result of ambush rather than going down in a "blaze of glory". Others died secluded deaths either from old age or illness.

Mythology and folklore often exaggerate the skills of famous gunfighters. Most of these historical figures were not known to be capable of trick shooting, nor did they necessarily have a reputation for precision sharpshooting. Such tropes that are frequently seen in Westerns include shooting the center of a coin, stylistic pistol twirling, glancing shots that intentionally only graze an opponent (the bullet through the hat being an example), shooting an opponent's belt buckle (thus dropping his pants), a bullet cutting the hangman's rope, or shooting the guns out of opponents' hands (typically as an alternative to killing). The last was debunked by Mythbusters as an impossibility, as unjacketed bullets tend to shatter into fragments that can hurt or even kill. Ed McGivern dispelled the myth of the inaccuracy of pistol fanning by shooting tight groups while fanning the revolver.

In Western movies, the characters' gun belts are often worn low on the hip and outer thigh, with the holster cut away around the pistol's trigger and grip for a smooth, fast draw. This type of holster is a Hollywood anachronism. Fast-draw artists can be distinguished from other movie cowboys because their guns will often be tied to their thigh. Long before holsters were steel-lined, they were soft and supple for comfortable all-day wear. A gunfighter would use tie-downs to keep his pistol from catching on the holster while drawing. Most of the time, gunfighters would just hide their pistols in their pockets and waistbands. Wild Bill Hickok popularized the butt-forward holster type, which worked better on horseback. Other gunfighters would use bridgeport rigs that gave a faster and easier draw. Revolvers were a popular weapon to gunfighters who were horsemen, cowboys, and lawmen because of their concealability and effectiveness on horseback. The Winchester rifle was also a popular weapon among gunfighters. Dubbed the "Gun that Won the West", it was widely used during the settlement of the American frontier. Shotguns were also a popular weapon for "express messengers" and guards, especially those on stagecoaches and trains who were in charge of overseeing and guarding a valuable private shipment.

Quick draw and hip shooting was a rare skill in the West, and only a handful of historically known gunslingers were known to be fast, such as Luke Short, John Wesley Hardin, and Wild Bill Hickok. Shooting a pistol with one hand is normally associated with gunslingers, and is also a standard for them of the era to carry two guns and fire ambidextrously. Capt. Jonathan R. Davis carried two revolvers in his iconic gunfight, while Jesse James himself carried over half a dozen revolvers in many of his gunfights.

Gunfighters King Fisher, John Wesley Hardin, Ben Thompson, Billy the Kid, Wild Bill Hickok, and Pat Garrett all died as a result of ambushes, killed by men who feared them because of their reputation. Gunmen Kid Curry, Jim Courtright, Dallas Stoudenmire and Dave Rudabaugh were killed in raging gun battles, much as portrayed in films about the era, and usually against more than one opponent. Bill Longley and Tom Horn were executed. Famed gunman Clay Allison died in a wagon accident. Gunmen Wyatt Earp, Bat Masterson, Bass Reeves, Commodore Perry Owens, and Luke Short all died of natural causes, living out their lives on reputation and avoiding conflict in secluded retirement. Gunfighter and lawman Frank Eaton, known as "Pistol Pete" lived into old age and gained further fame, before his death at age 97, by becoming the mascot for Oklahoma A&M College (now Oklahoma State University). Rare are the gunfighters who, like William Sidney "Cap" Light, died accidentally by their own hand.

Famous gunfights 

The image of a Wild West filled with countless gunfights was a myth generated primarily by dime-novel authors in the late 19th century. An estimate of 20,000 men in the American West were killed by gunshot between 1866 and 1900, and over 21,586 total casualties during the American Indian Wars from 1850 to 1890. The most notable and well-known took place in the states/territories of Arizona, New Mexico, Kansas, Oklahoma, and Texas. Actual gunfights in the Old West were very rare, very few and far between, but when gunfights did occur, the cause for each varied. Some were simply the result of the heat of the moment, while others were longstanding feuds, or between bandits and lawmen. Lawless violence such as range wars like the Lincoln County War and clashes with Indians were also a cause. Some of these shootouts became famous, while others faded into history with only a few accounts surviving. To prevent gunfights from happening, many cities in the American frontier, such as Dodge City and Tombstone, put up a local ordinance to prohibit firearms in the area.

The Gunfight at the OK Corral is a famous example of a real-life western shootout, between the Earp Brothers together with Doc Holliday, and the Clanton-McLaury gang. It lasted only 30 seconds, contrary to many movie adaptations. The gunfight itself did not actually happen in the corral but in a vacant lot outside of it. The shooting started when Billy Clanton and Frank McLaury cocked their pistols. Both parties simultaneously drew their guns, which added to the confusion about who fired first. It is not known who fired the first shot, but Wyatt's bullet was the first to hit, tearing through Frank McLaury's belly and sending McLaury's own shot wild through Wyatt's coattail. Billy Clanton fired at Virgil, but his shot also went astray when he was hit with Morgan's shot through his ribcage. Billy Claiborne ran as soon as shots were fired and was already out of sight. Ike Clanton panicked as well and ran towards Wyatt pleading for his life. "Go to fighting or get away!", Wyatt yelled and watched Ike desert his brother Billy and run. Doc instantly killed Tom with blasts from his shotgun. Frank was running to Fremont Street, and he challenged Holliday for killing his brother, but Doc dropped his shotgun, drew his pistol, and shot Frank in the right temple. Wounded and dying, Billy Clanton fired blindly into the gun smoke encircling him, striking Virgil's leg. Wyatt responded by sending several rounds into Billy.

On April 14, 1881, lawman Dallas Stoudenmire participated in a gunfight in El Paso, Texas which many dubbed the Four Dead in Five Seconds Gunfight, in which he killed three of the four fatalities with his twin .44 caliber Colt revolvers. One of those killed was an innocent Mexican bystander. Less than a year after these incidents, he would kill as many as six more men in gunfights while in the line of duty.

Another well-documented gunfight resulted in the most kills by one person in a single event, when Capt. Jonathan R. Davis shot eleven bandits single-handedly on 19 December 1854. Unknown to Davis and his companions, a band of robbers was lying in wait in the canyon brush near the trail. They were a typically diverse and motley group of Gold Rush bandits: two Americans, one Frenchman, two Britons, five Sydney Ducks, and four Mexicans. As Captain Davis and his companions trudged on foot, the bandit gang charged out of the brush, pistols flaming. James McDonald died instantly, without time to draw his revolver or react in any way. Dr. Bolivar managed to get his six-shooter out and fire twice at the highwaymen before he dropped, badly wounded. Captain Davis later described himself as being "in a fever of excitement at the time." Unfazed, he stood his ground, pulling out both pistols and firing a barrage at the charging outlaws. He shot down his assailants, one after another. The outlaws' bullets tore at Davis's clothing but caused only two slight flesh wounds. Within moments, seven of the bandits were dead or dying on the ground and Davis's pistols were empty. Four of the remaining robbers now closed in on the captain to finish him off. Davis whipped out his Bowie knife and quickly warded off the thrusts from the two of the bandits. He stabbed one of them to death; the other he disarmed by knocking the knife from his grasp and slicing off his nose and a finger of his right hand. The two last attackers were the men who had been wounded in a previous bandit raid. Despite their weakened condition, they foolishly approached Davis with drawn knives. The captain reacted in an instant. Slashing with his heavy Bowie, he killed them both.

On December 1, 1884, a town sheriff named Elfego Baca came face-to-face against 80 gunmen which became known as the Frisco shootout. The battle started when Baca arrested a cowboy who had shot him. In turn, the cowboy called upon 80 of his associates to murder Baca. Baca took refuge in an adobe house, and over the course of a 36-hour siege, the gunmen put 400 bullet holes in the house (some accounts say a total of 4,000 shots) without touching Baca. He in turn killed 4 of them and wounded 8. When the shooting was over as the attackers finally ran out of ammo, Baca strolled out of the house unscathed. Baca went on to a distinguished career as a lawyer and legislator and died in his bed in 1945, at age 80.

In January 1887 Commodore Perry Owens took office as Sheriff of Apache County, Arizona. He sent two deputies to arrest Ike Clanton. Clanton had instigated the Gunfight at the OK Corral and was charged with the later ambush shooting of Virgil Earp. Wyatt Earp searched for Ike Clanton in his vendetta, but never found him – Ike moved north to Apache County to continue rustling cattle and killing. Owens' two deputies killed Ike Clanton; Phin Clanton was arrested; three other gang members were killed; and the Clanton gang was done. Then Sheriff Owens turned his attention to the Blevins family, the other rustling gang in the county. In June 1887 Old Man Blevins disappeared, presumably killed by the Tewksbury faction of the Pleasant Valley War. The Blevins sons searched for their father and in August Hamp Blevins and another were killed by the Tewksbury side. So Andy Blevins (aka Cooper) ambushed and killed John Tewksbury and Bill Jacobs in revenge. Blevins returned to Holbrook and was heard bragging about his killings. Sheriff Owens had inherited a warrant for Andy Blevins' (Cooper) arrest for horse theft so he rode to Holbook on September 2, 1887. Sheriff Owens had hunted buffalo for the railroad and could shoot his Winchester from the hip with great accuracy. Cradling his Winchester rifle in his arm, Sheriff Owens knocked on the Blevins' door. Andy Blevins answered with a pistol in hand, the lawman told him to come out, that he had a warrant for arrest. Blevins refused and tried to close the door. Owens shot his rifle from his hip through the door, hitting Andy Blevins in the stomach. Andy's half-brother, John Blevins, pushed a pistol out the door to Owens' right and fired at the Sheriff. He missed and Owens shot John Blevins in the arm, putting him out of the fight. Owens saw Andy Blevins in the window moving to shoot back. Owens shot through the wall, striking Andy in the right hip – he died that night. Mose Roberts, boarding with the family, jumped out of a side window with a pistol. Sheriff Owens shot him through his back and chest, killing him. Fifteen-year-old Samuel Houston Blevins ran out the front door, with his brother's revolver, and yelled "I'll get him." His mother ran out after him. Owens shot and Sam fell backward, dying in his mother's arms. The shootout took less than one minute and made Owens a legend. In eight months Sheriff Owens had rid Apache County of two notorious gangs of rustlers and killers.

In many early western films and literature, Native Americans were often portrayed as savages; having conflicts and battles against gunfighters and White settlements. According to the U.S. Bureau of the Census (1894), an estimated 19,000 White men, women, and children were killed while the Indians killed numbered between 30,000 and 45,000 casualties during the American Indian Wars. Gunfighters in history did fight Native Americans. Among them was civilian Billy Dixon, who made one of the longest recorded sniper kills, by shooting an Indian off his horse almost a mile away with his Sharps rifle, during a standoff in the Second Battle of Adobe Walls.

General George S. Patton himself had a gunfight when he was a young second lieutenant chasing Pancho Villa all over northern Mexico in 1916. Patton and 10 enlisted men had been sent to San Miguelito Ranch to look for Villa, who had recently raided the city of Columbus, New Mexico. Patton positioned his men by the south gate and was making his way up to the north gate when a trio of Villa's men came into the ranch on horseback. Patton drew his obsolete single-action Colt Peacemaker revolver and shot two of the men. The first man had been fatally wounded in the exchange and tried to draw his pistol before Patton killed him with a single shot. After his troops took down the remaining outlaw, Patton tied the three dead men to the hood of his touring car and drove the bodies back to his commanding officer.

Real-life Wild West duels 

The image of two gunslingers with violent reputations squaring off in a street is a Hollywood invention. However, face-to-face fast draw shootouts did occur in the real West. These duels were first recorded in the South, brought by emigrants to the American Frontier as a crude form of the "code duello," a highly formalized means of solving disputes between gentlemen with swords or guns that had its origins in European chivalry. By the second half of the 19th century, few Americans still fought duels to solve their problems, and became a thing of the past in the United States by the start of the 20th century. Writer Wyatt-Brown in his book "Southern Honor: Ethics and Behavior in the Old South" described dueling in the American frontier as a "custom", and was primarily used for teenage disputes, rise in rank, status, and scapegoating.

The most famous and well-recorded duel occurred on 21 July 1865, in Springfield, Missouri. Wild Bill Hickok and Davis Tutt quarreled over cards and decided to have a gunfight. They arranged to walk toward each other at 6 pm. Wild Bill's armed presence caused the crowd to immediately scatter to the safety of nearby buildings, leaving Tutt alone in the northwestern corner of the square. When they were about 50 yards apart, both men drew their guns. The two fired at the same time, but Hickok's shot hit Tutt in the heart, while Tutt's shot missed. This was the first recorded example of two men taking part in a quick-draw duel. The following month Hickok was acquitted after pleading self-defense. The first story of the shootout was detailed in an article in Harper's Magazine in 1867 and became a staple of the gunslinger legend.

The famous lawman Wyatt Earp gave an account of having participated in a duel once during his vendetta. While in the South Pass of the Dragoon Mountains, Earp's posse found one of the outlaw cowboys named "Indian Charlie" Cruz. One account says that after the party recognized Cruz, they chased him down and a gunfight ensued. The party managed to capture Cruz and he confessed to having taken part in Morgan's murder, and that he identified Stilwell, Hank Swilling, Curly Bill, and Johnny Ringo as other of Morgan's killers. During that time, Wyatt allowed Cruz to keep his revolver to "give him a chance to fight like a man." After the confession, Wyatt told Cruz to draw, challenging him to a duel, and the posse counted to three before Wyatt gunned Cruz down.

The Langford–Peel shootout occurred on July 22, 1867, between gunmen John Bull and Langford Peel.

Doc Holliday himself had a duel in a saloon in Las Vegas, New Mexico. One of the women who worked there had an ex-boyfriend named Mike Gordon who had just been discharged from the Army. Gordon wanted her to stop working. When she told him to leave her alone, he became angry, went outside the saloon, and started shooting out the windows with his pistol. As bullets went through the saloon, Doc unflinching, holstered his Colt Peacemaker revolver and walked outside. Gordon then started shooting at him but missed. Holliday then drew his pistol and shot Gordon at long range with one shot. He then went back to the saloon. Gordon died the next day and Holliday fled. Doc Holliday has also been credited with wounding and shooting a pistol out of saloon owner Milt Joyce's hand when he tried to brandish it at Holliday.

Another well-known duel in the American West happened in Fort Worth, Texas, and was known as the Luke Short-Jim Courtright Duel. Timothy Isaiah "Longhair Jim" Courtright was running the T.I.C. Commercial agency in Fort Worth, which provided "protection" to gambling dens and saloons in return for a portion of their profits. At the same time, Luke Short, a former friend of Courtright's, was running the White Elephant Saloon and Jim was trying to get Short to utilize his services. But the Dodge City gunfighter told Courtright to "go to Hell," and that he could do anything that was necessary to take care of his business. On February 8, 1887, the two quarreled, and with Bat Masterson at Short's side, Courtright and Short dueled in the street. They drew their pistols at close range, and Short fired first, blowing off Courtright's thumb. Courtright attempted the "border shift", a move where a gunfighter switches his gun to his uninjured hand, but he was too slow. Short shot him in the chest, killing him.

The Long Branch Saloon Shootout, involving Levi Richardson, a buffalo hunter, and "Cockeyed Frank" Loving, a professional gambler, happened on April 5, 1879. Richardson had developed some affection for Loving's wife Mattie, and the two began to argue about her. In the saloon, Frank sat down at a long table, Richardson turned around and took a seat at the same table. The two were then heard speaking in low voices. After the conversation, Richardson drew his pistol, and Loving drew his in response. The Long Branch Saloon was then filled with smoke. Dodge City Marshal Charlie Bassett, who was in Beatty & Kelley's Saloon, heard the shots and came running. Both men were still standing, although Richardson had fired five shots from his gun and Loving's Remington No. 44 was empty. Deputy Sheriff Duffey threw Richardson down in a chair and took his gun, while Bassett disarmed Loving. Richardson then got up and started toward the billiard table, when he fell to the floor with a fatal gunshot in the chest, as well as a shot through the side and another through the right arm. Frank Loving, who had only a slight scratch on his hand, was immediately taken to jail. Two days later, the coroner's inquest ruled that the killing had been in self-defense and Loving was immediately released.

On March 9, 1877, gamblers Jim Levy and Charlie Harrison argued over a game of cards in a saloon in Cheyenne, Wyoming. They met in an alley following an argument about a card game. Harrison shot first but missed. Levy aimed carefully and hit Harrison, who died a week later.

Not as well known today but famous in his time was the dapper, derby-wearing train robber Marion Hedgepeth, who despite his swell appearance, "was a deadly killer and one of the fastest guns in the Wild, Wild West". William Pinkerton, whose National Detective Agency had sought to capture Hedgepeth and his gang for years, noted that Hedgepeth once gunned down another outlaw who had already unholstered his pistol before Hedgepath had drawn his revolver. The infamous assassin Tom Horn was also said to have participated in a duel with a second lieutenant from the Mexican Army, due to a dispute with a prostitute when he was twenty-six years old. Gunfighters Jim Levy and Tom Carberry became infamous for participating in at least two quick draw duels in their lifetimes.

Living on reputation 
Most Old West men who were labeled as being "gunfighters" did not kill nearly as many men in gunfights as they were given credit for, if any at all. They were often labeled as such due to one particular instance, which developed from rumors about them having been involved in many more events than they actually were. Often their reputation was as much "self-promotion" as anything else; such was the case of Bat Masterson. Wyatt Earp with his brothers Morgan and Virgil along with Doc Holliday killed three outlaw Cowboys in the Gunfight at the O.K. Corral in Tombstone, Arizona Territory. He has been said to have been involved in more than one hundred gunfights in his lifetime. But Prof. Bill O'Neal cites just five incidents in his Encyclopedia of Western Gunfighters. Earp expressed his dismay about the controversy that followed him his entire life. He wrote in a letter to John Hays Hammond on May 21, 1925, that "notoriety had been the bane of my life."

After his brother Virgil was maimed in an ambush and Morgan was assassinated by hidden assailants, the men suspected of involvement were provided alibis by fellow Cowboys and released without trial. Wyatt and his brother Warren set out on a vendetta ride to locate and kill those they felt were responsible. Wyatt has been portrayed in a number of films and books as a fearless Western hero. He is often viewed as the central character and hero of the Gunfight at the O.K. Corral, at least in part because he was the only one who was not wounded or killed. In fact, his brother, Tombstone Marshal and Deputy U.S. Marshal Virgil Earp had considerably more experience with weapons and combat as a Union soldier in the Civil War, and in law enforcement as a sheriff, constable, and marshal. As city marshal, Virgil made the decision to disarm the Cowboys in Tombstone and requested Wyatt's assistance. But because Wyatt outlived Virgil and due to a creative biography, Wyatt Earp: Frontier Marshal published two years after Wyatt's death, Wyatt became famous and the subject of various movies, television shows, biographies and works of fiction.

There are no records to support the reputation that Johnny Ringo developed. Of the documented instances where Ringo killed men, they were unarmed, and there is no evidence to support his participation in a single gunfight. Others deserved the reputation associated with them. Jim Courtright and Dallas Stoudenmire both killed several men in gunfights both as lawmen and as civilians. Clay Allison and Ben Thompson had well-deserved reputations.<ref name=CunninghamS-WO-TAC-AV>Cunningham, Sharon. – [http://www.westernoutlaw.com/stories/files/Allisonforweb.pdf "The Allison Clan – A Visit"'] . – Western Outlaw. – (Adobe Acrobat *.PDF document).</ref> At the same time, gunmen like Scott Cooley are all but unknown, when they actually led a life reflective of what most would consider a gunfighter to be. In other cases, certain gunfighters were possibly confused, over time, with being someone else with a similar name. The most well-known of Butch Cassidy's Wild Bunch gang, the Sundance Kid, was in reality only known to have been in one shootout during his lifetime, and no gunfights. Some historians have since stated that it is possible that over time he was confused with another Wild Bunch member, Kid Curry, who was without a doubt the most dangerous member of the gang, having killed many lawmen and civilians during his lifetime before being killed himself. Hence, it is the Sundance Kid who is better known.

 Outlaw or lawman 
It is often difficult to separate lawmen of the Old West from outlaws of the Old West. In many cases, the term gunfighter was applied to constables. Despite idealistic portrayals in television, movies, and even in history books, very few lawmen/gunfighters could claim their law enforcement role as their only source of employment. Unlike contemporary peace officers, these lawmen generally pursued other occupations, often earning money as gamblers, business owners, or outlaws—as was the case with "Curly" Bill Brocius, who, while always referred to as an outlaw, served as a deputy sheriff under sheriff Johnny Behan. Many shootouts involving lawmen were caused by disputes arising from these alternative occupations, rather than the lawman's attempts to enforce the law.

Tom Horn, historically cited as an assassin, served both as a deputy sheriff and as a Pinkerton detective, a job in which he shot at least three people as a killer for hire. Ben Thompson, best known as a gunfighter and gambler, was a very successful chief of police in Austin, Texas. King Fisher had great success as a county sheriff in Texas. Doc Holliday and Billy the Kid both wore badges as lawmen at least once. "Big" Steve Long served as deputy marshal for Laramie, Wyoming, while the entire time committing murders and forced theft of land deeds. A town with a substantial violent crime rate would often turn to a known gunman as their town marshal, chief, or sheriff, in the hopes that the gunman could stem the violence and bring order.

Known gunmen/lawmen were generally effective, and in time the violence would subside, usually, after the gunman/lawman had been involved in several shooting incidents, eventually leading to a substantial and well-earned fear that kept everyone in line. At times they were hired by cattlemen or other prominent figures to serve as henchmen or enforcers during cattle wars. Although sanctioned by law enforcement officials, the gunmen were not always actually deputized. Sometimes, however, just to make things "official", they would go through the formality of deputization. A case in point: the service of the Jesse Evans Gang, and outlaw Jesse Evans himself, as agents for the Murphy-Dolan faction during the Lincoln County War. While technically working as lawmen, they were little more than hired guns.

Usually, when a gunman was hired by a town as town marshal, they received the full support of the townspeople until order was restored, at which point the town would tactfully indicate it was time for a change to a less dangerous lawman who relied more on respect than fear to enforce the law. A good example was the 1882 decision by the El Paso, Texas, town council to dismiss Town Marshal Dallas Stoudenmire. He entered the council hall and dared the councilors to try to take his guns or his job, at which point they immediately changed their mind, saying he could keep his job. He resigned on his own a couple of days later.

Legacy
 Modern gunslinger 

People relive the Wild West both historically and in popular culture by participating in cowboy action shooting events, where each gunslinger adopts his or her own look representing a character from Western life in the late 1800s, and as part of that character, chooses an alias to go by. The sport originated in Southern California, USA, in the early 1980s but is now practiced in many places with several sanctioning organizations including the Single Action Shooting Society (SASS), Western Action Shootists Association (WASA), and National Congress of Old West Shooters (NCOWS), as well as others in the US and in other countries. There are different categories shooters can compete in. There's the gunfighter, frontiersman, classic cowboy, and duelist – each with its own specifications.

Alongside the iconic cowboy, gunfighters have become a cultural image of the American people abroad, and also as an idealized image of violence, frontier justice, and adventure.Microsoft Encarta 2007 edition: Cowboy Even outside of the Western genre, the term 'gunslinger' has been used in modern times to describe someone who is fast and accurate with pistols, either in real life or in other fictional action genres.

The quick draw which gunfighters help popularize, is still an important skill in the American military and law enforcement communities.

 In popular culture 

Gunfighters have been featured in media even outside the Western genre, often combined with other elements and genres, mainly science-fiction space Westerns, steampunk, and the contemporary setting. Abilities, clothing, and attitude associated with gunfighters are seen in many other genres. An example of this is "Han shot first", in which Han Solo, a gunfighter-like protagonist in Star Wars, kills his opponent with a subtle, under-the-table draw. He also wore his holster low on, and tied to, the thigh with a cutaway for the trigger. Roland Deschain from the fantasy series The Dark Tower is a gunfighter pitted against fantasy-themed monsters and enemies. Inspired by the "Man with No Name" and other spaghetti-western characters, he himself is detached or unsympathetic, often reacting as uncaring or angry at signs of cowardice or self-pity, yet he possesses a strong sense of heroism, often attempting to help those in need, a morality much seen in Westerns.

Jonah Hex, from DC Comics, is a ruthless bounty hunter bound by a personal code of honor to protect and avenge the innocent. IGN ranked Jonah Hex the 73rd greatest comic book hero of all time. Throughout the DC Universe, Hex has been, on many occasions, transported from the Old West to the contemporary setting and beyond. Even in unfamiliar territory and time periods, Hex managed to outgun his enemies with more advanced weaponry. Two-Gun Kid is another comic book gunfighter from Marvel Comics. Skilled with revolvers, he has aided many superheroes in future timelines, most notably She-Hulk.

Many Japanese manga and anime have also adopted the western genre. Yasuhiro Nightow is known for creating the space Western Trigun. The story's protagonist, Vash the Stampede, is a wandering gunslinger with a dark past. Unlike other violence-themed gunslingers, Vash carries a Shane-like pacifist attitude, and avoids killing men, even dangerous enemies. Behind him is the gun-toting priest named Nicholas D. Wolfwood, who carries with him a heavy machine gun and rocket launcher shaped like a cross. Nicholas is more violent than Vash, and the two would often argue about killing opponents. Other western genre-themed manga and anime include Cowboy Bebop and Kino's Journey, which both incorporate knight-errant gunslinger themes.

Modern-day western gunslingers have also appeared in recent Neo-Westerns. Raylan Givens from the television series Justified shares the same ambiguous moral code of an Old West sheriff, even using a fast draw to dispatch his enemies. The hitman Anton Chigurh from No Country for Old Men shares many elements of a hunted outlaw. Additionally, the comic book character Vigilante is a self-proclaimed gunfighter born in the 1940s.

Gunfighters have also been featured in many video games, both in traditional Old West and in contemporary and future settings. Colton White was the protagonist of 2005's best-selling western video game Gun. Another well-known video game Western protagonist is John Marston from Red Dead Redemption, who was nominated for 2010 Spike's Video Game Awards, as well as his friend Arthur Morgan in Red Dead Redemption 2. The New York Times stated: "he and his creators conjure such a convincing, cohesive and enthralling re-imagination of the real world that it sets a new standard for sophistication and ambition in electronic gaming." The main character Caleb in the video games Blood and Blood II: The Chosen is also a former Old West gunfighter. Gunfighter is also a callsign for a group of two Apache Helicopters in the video game Medal of Honor''. They appear on a mission named "Gunfighters", and the player will act as Captain Brad "Hawk" Hawkins from 1st Aviation Regiment.

Former professional American football quarterback Brett Favre was nicknamed "The Gunslinger" due to his rural, Southern upbringing and his wild, risky, quick-throwing play style that led him to great success in the National Football League.

References

Sources

Further reading
 
 

 
American mercenaries
Combat occupations
Stock characters
Western (genre) staples and terminology